Sekolah Menengah Kebangsaan Datok Lokman or SMK Datok Lokman (SMKDL) is a public secondary school in Kuala Lumpur, Malaysia. The school is located at Jalan Kampung Pandan, which is near SMK Aminuddin Baki. The school was named after the first Lord Mayor (Datuk Bandar) of Kuala Lumpur, Tan Sri Dato' Lokman Yusof.

Schools in Kuala Lumpur